Maddulapalli is a village of jagtial district pegadapalli mandal 
Assembly constituency : Dharmapuri assembly constituency 
Lok Sabha constituency : Peddapalli parliamentary constituency,
Telangana state of India.

References

Villages in Khammam district